The Dr. John Ives House is a Federal style house in the town of DeWitt, New York, on a hill overlooking the hamlet of Jamesville.  It has a widow's walk on top. The original property included . Over the years the property was sold and divided amongst family members.

It includes 3 contributing buildings—the house, a barn, and a smokehouse—over a  area.

It was the home of John Ives, a Jamesville dentist.

References

External links

Houses on the National Register of Historic Places in New York (state)
Historic American Buildings Survey in New York (state)
Federal architecture in New York (state)
Houses completed in 1813
Houses in Onondaga County, New York
DeWitt, New York
National Register of Historic Places in Onondaga County, New York